Matthew Parish (born 1975 in Leeds) is a British international lawyer and scholar of international relations, based in England and Eastern Europe. In September 2021, Parish was sentenced to three years in prison for his role in a fake arbitration in a dispute between rival members of the Kuwaiti ruling family.

Early life and education
Parish was born in Leeds, in West Yorkshire, the son of a biochemist and of a social worker.

Parish attended Harrogate Grammar School before he moved to Cambridge University where he graduated from Christ's College, Cambridge in 1996. In 2004, he earned a Master of law degree from the University of Chicago Law School, and a Doctor of Juridical Science in 2007, with a thesis titled  'Reconstructing a divided society: learning from northeast Bosnia'  whose supervisors were Richard A. Posner and Eric Posner.

From 2000, Parish has been a non-practicing English barrister, English solicitor, a member of the Swiss bar and a New York attorney since 2005.

Career and publications 
Before 2005 Parish worked in the legal department of the World Bank.

Between 2005 and 2007 Parish worked as head of legal department for the Brcko Final Award Office of the High Representative for Bosnia and Herzegovina (OHR). He then moved to Geneva, where he worked in different law firms and held positions as visiting lecturer and honorary professor in various universities.

Parish's book on reconstruction in post-war Brcko, A Free City in the Balkans (2009), has attracted domestic and international attention. The book has been criticized for being too sceptical of the international community's statebuilding efforts in the country.

Parish's book Mirages of International Justice (2011) advances a constructivist account of international law.

Parish was named as one of the 300 most influential people in Switzerland by Bilan Magazine.

Private practice  

Parish left Akin Gump's Geneva office for Holman Fenwick Willan's (HFW) Geneva office in 2011. In December 2014 he and a colleague at HFW set up their own practice, Gentium Law Group. Gentium was one of the first in a new breed of "boutique" arbitration law firms that involves teams of senior arbitration lawyers splitting away from large established law firms and forming their own smaller practices under new brands. The group was the first firm to be nominated as a Global Arbitration Review Top 100 Law Firm worldwide within the first year of its operation. The Gentium Law Group, has been named by Global Arbitration Review in consecutive years as one of the top one hundred law firms worldwide in its field. In November 2018 Parish ceased to manage the company having handed control to a new partner.

In 2013 and 2018 Parish was named by Bilan magazine as one of the three hundred most influential people in Switzerland.

Legal issues 
In 2018, Parish was found guilty of criminal defamation in Switzerland for making the reports to Western intelligence services accusing his former clients, Murat Seitnepesov and Konstantin Ryndin, of money laundering, fraud and financing terrorism. Sentenced to two months, Parish reports in a self-published book that he spent 23 days in prison.

Parish was further charged in 2019. He was subsequently fined, given a one-year suspended prison sentence and instructed by the court to see a psychiatrist. Reuters reported that a spokesman for the Geneva prosecutor's office said: "Mr. Parish is found guilty of defamation, calumny, a coercion attempt and of failing to conform with an authority’s decision." Parish indicated his intention to appeal the conviction.

Parish has also been indicted for his alleged role in a fake arbitration in a dispute between rival members of the Kuwaiti ruling family about the authenticity of videos showing corruption and breach of Iran sanctions. AP reported in February 2021 that a court hearing had been held and adjourned until August 2021. In September 2021, Parish was convicted and sentenced to three years' jail time and was banned from practicing law in Switzerland. As AP reports, "Judge Gonseth said he was an arbitration expert and 'manifestly' involved at all stages of the process".

Works

Books
A Free City in the Balkans: Reconstructing a Divided Society in Bosnia I.B. Tauris, London, October 2009.  
Mirages of International Justice: The Elusive Pursuit of a Transnational Legal Edward Elgar, London, May 2011.  
Ethnic Civil War and the Promise of Law Edward Elgar, London, 2016.

References

External links 

Interview with Matthew Parish, 28 August 2010, Part 1
Interview with Matthew Parish, 29 August 2010, Part 2
Interview with Matthew Parish, 16 February 2011 
Parish's articles on Transconflict
Parish's articles on Balkan Insight

Alumni of Christ's College, Cambridge
University of Chicago Law School alumni
Scholars of nationalism
International relations scholars
International law scholars
Living people
1975 births